Mutambara is a city in southwest Burundi, in Bururi Province. It is sited on the shores of Lake Tanganyika, to the north of Nyanza Lac and southwest of Bururi.

References
Fitzpatrick, M., Parkinson, T., & Ray, N. (2006) East Africa. Footscray, VIC: Lonely Planet.

Populated places in Burundi